The 1996 Paris Open was a men's tennis tournament played on indoor carpet courts. It was the 24th edition of the Paris Masters and was part of the Mercedes Super 9 of the 1996 ATP Tour. It took place at the Palais Omnisports de Paris-Bercy in Paris in France from 28 October through 4 November 1996. Thomas Enqvist won the singles.

Finals

Singles

 Thomas Enqvist defeated  Yevgeny Kafelnikov 6–2, 6–4, 7–5
 It was Enqvist's 2nd title of the year and the 7th of his career. It was his 1st Masters title of the year and his 1st overall.

Doubles

 Jacco Eltingh /  Paul Haarhuis defeated  Yevgeny Kafelnikov /  Daniel Vacek 6–4, 4–6, 7–6
 It was Eltingh's 2nd title of the year and the 32nd of his career. It was Haarhuis' 3rd title of the year and the 31st of his career.

References

External links
 Official website
 ATP tournament profile